Paul Howard Steed Jr. (November 6, 1964 – August 11, 2012) was a video game modeller and artist. He worked for Origin Systems, Electronic Arts, id Software, Wild Tangent, Microsoft's Xbox, Atari, and Exigent. He created artwork or models for several prominent game series including Wing Commander and Quake. He was employed by id Software until he was fired in retaliation for conflict over the creation of Doom 3 (according to John Carmack).

Steed began his career with videogames in 1991 at Origin Systems, after answering a newspaper ad that said "Fantasy artist wanted". Starting as a game design sketcher, he moved up to art director then project director. Steed has indicated he "didn't touch a mouse until I was 27." He worked as an art director at Virgin Entertainment and a designer at Iguana entertainment as well. In 2000 after being fired from id Software he went to work for Wild Tangent making several dancing girl visualizers for Winamp and a third-person shooter called Betty Bad (an homage to Steed's favorite arcade game, Tempest).

Steed gained press and controversy with the release of a "Crackwhore" female model for Quake II in response to a skin (character texture) contest for the first Quake sponsored by a group of female gamers who called themselves the "Crackwhore Clan". The Crackwhore model was released after Quake II was released as a downloadable character as an homage to that same female gamer clan. While Quake II included a female character as an option when playing, both the phraseology and approach to the Crackwhore model received some amount of criticism despite the 'Crackwhore Clan' having been created and organized by and composed solely of female gamers - not Paul Steed.

He was active in the game development community and gave talks not only at the annual Game Developer's Conference, but also at universities and art institutes. He initiated and sponsored several modeling contests such as the Bad Girl and Cute Doll contests by which he challenged any and all other modelers to compete against him for sponsored prizes. Paul convinced many vendors like Autodesk to contribute those prizes as well as recognition to the contest winners.

A published author, Paul Steed wrote three books on modeling and animating game characters for 3D games. He served on the Advisory Board for GDC for many years and as creative director for Microsoft's Xbox and Atari he gained experience on the other side of the developer fence. He left Atari in 2006 to co-found Exigent with Garland Wong and Jesse Rapczak. As President and Chief Creative Officer at Exigent, a global game art company for next generation and casual games, Paul oversaw more than 100 artists in India and China while consulting with top developers and publishers. Lately he provided creative and managerial leadership for an unannounced UTV Ignition Entertainment project, but subsequently moved on to a series of casual and console projects.

Steed died on August 11, 2012.

Bibliography
 Steed, Paul (2001). Modelling a Character in 3DS Max. Wordware Publishing. .
 Steed, Paul (2002). Animating Real-Time Game Characters. Charles River Media. .
 Steed, Paul (2005). Modelling a Character in 3DS Max, 2nd Edition. Wordware Publishing.

References

External links
Paul Steed profile on MobyGames

Video game artists
2012 deaths
1964 births
Id Software people
Origin Systems people